On 13 and 19 January 1975, El Al aircraft at Paris-Orly Airport, France were subject to attempted RPG attacks by Popular Front for the Liberation of Palestine (PFLP) terrorists led by Carlos the Jackal. While the intended attacks failed, collateral damage was suffered and the second attack resulted in gunfighting and a seventeen-hour hostage situation.

In the first attack, Carlos and Johannes Weinrich of the Revolutionary Cells fired two RPGs at an El Al aircraft, but missed and instead hit a Yugoslav plane and an administration building, injuring three people.  Six days later, Carlos returned with three Palestinian terrorists, and another attempted RPG-attack on an El Al airplane was thwarted, resulting in a hostage situation and gunfights with police. Twenty people were wounded after grenades were thrown by the terrorists into the airport terminal. The terminal building was surrounded by hundreds of French riot police, and French Interior Minister Michel Poniatowski arrived at the scene and reportedly became involved in negotiating with the terrorists. After seventeen hours, the ten hostages including one child were released in return for the three remaining terrorists, excluding Carlos who had fled during the gunfight, being flown to Baghdad, Iraq.

References 

January 1975 events in Europe
1975 in France
1975 in Paris
Palestinian terrorist incidents in Europe
Popular Front for the Liberation of Palestine attacks
Communist terrorism
Orly
El Al accidents and incidents
Terrorist incidents in Paris
Terrorist incidents in France in 1975
1975 crimes in France